Aughwick Creek is a  tributary of the Juniata River in Huntingdon County, Pennsylvania in the United States.

Aughwick Creek, born from the confluence of Little Aughwick Creek and Sideling Hill Creek near the community of Maddensville, joins the Juniata River a few miles below Mount Union.

Bridges

The Runk Bridge crosses Aughwick Creek at Shirley Township.

See also
List of rivers of Pennsylvania

References

External links
U.S. Geological Survey: PA stream gaging stations

Rivers of Pennsylvania
Tributaries of the Juniata River
Rivers of Huntingdon County, Pennsylvania